John Abrams may refer to:
 John Abrams (field hockey) (born 1934), New Zealand field hockey player
 John N. Abrams (1946–2018), United States Army general

See also
 John Abram (born 1959), Anglo-Canadian composer